The muscaliet is an animal from Medieval bestiaries.  13th century Bestiaire includes a description of the animal, comparing it in various aspects to hares, squirrels, weasels, moles and pigs. De Beauvais also describes the muscaliet as nesting beneath the trees it climbs, damaging them through its body heat.

References 

Medieval European legendary creatures
Legendary mammals
Mythological hybrids